Mariscal Estigarribia is a town in the Boquerón Department, Paraguay.

Strategic importance 
Mariscal Estigarribia is home to Dr. Luis Maria Argaña International Airport (IATA code: ESG), which some media reports claim is a US military base set up to provide access to the strategic Triple Frontera region.

400 US troops arrived in Paraguay in July 2005, shortly after the Paraguayan Senate granted US troops diplomatic immunity. Hundreds of US military personnel are rotated though Paraguay each year, though the military has stated that the total number in the country will not exceed 10–20 at any time.

The Clarín newspaper reports that Mariscal Estigarribia would be a strategic location for a military base because of its proximity to the Triple Frontera between Paraguay, Brazil and Argentina; the Guarani aquifer; and Bolivia (less than 200 km at a time when "Washington's magnifying glass goes on the Altiplano and points toward Venezuelan Hugo Chávez—the regional demon according to Bush's administration—as the instigator of the instability in the region".)

The US and Paraguayan governments deny that the US military is establishing a base at Mariscal Estigarribia. The US government said "...limited, short-term deployments of U.S. military personnel are scheduled to take place for a series of joint exercises with the Paraguayan military between July 2005 and December 2006. Most personnel deployed will not remain in Paraguay for more than 45 days."

A Brazilian weekly news magazine, CartaCapital, published an investigative article on 25 April 2008, that dismisses what it calls a conspiracy theory about the base.

Climate

References

External links 
Mariscal Estigarribia airbase at Helis.com – includes Google Maps
Dr Luís María Argaña International Airport

Populated places in the Boquerón Department
Populated places established in 1944
1944 establishments in Paraguay